Boconád is a village in Heves County, Northern Hungary Region, Hungary.

Sights to visit
 Statue of John of Nepomuk
 Baroque ensemble of Szeleczky castle

See also
 List of populated places in Hungary

References

External links
 

Populated places in Heves County